Alexey Nikolayevich Titov (July 12, 1769 - November 8, 1827), was a Russian composer and violinist. His son, Nikolai Titov, was a composer, as were several other family members.

Titov was born and died in St. Petersburg.  Alongside his musical career, Titov was a major general in the Russian cavalry. His music, most of which is for the stage (operas, ballets, and incidental music), was primarily written for local St. Petersburg theater and dance companies. Strong Russian themes run through his choice of libretti, and his music makes copious use of Russian folk music. He was most popular for his comic operas such as Yam, or The Post Station (1805), The Winter Party, or The Sequel to Yam (1808) and The Wedding Eve Party, or Filakin's Wedding (1809), which form a trilogy. All of them were staged in St. Petersburg.

Operas
Note:this list is incomplete.
Andromeda and Perseus (1802)
King Solomon's Judgment (1803)
Judge Cupid, or The Argument of the Three Graces (1805)
Yam, or The Post Station ; 1805)
 Nurzakhad (1807)
The Winter Party, or The Sequel to Yam (1808)
The Wedding Eve Party, or Filakin's Wedding (1809)
Polixena (1809)
The Cossack Woman (1810)
 Emmerik Tekeli (1812)
 Maslenitsa (1813)
 Mogul's Holiday, or Olimar's Celebration (1823)

Family 
Alexey Titov's brother Sergey was a famous violinist,  violist and cellist.

On January 23, 1790 Titov married Yelizaveta Turchaninova (4 November 4, 1774 – March 25, 1827), the daughter of the business magnate Alexei Turchaninov. Titov got a huge dowry. With her sisters Natalya Koltovskaya and Nadezhda Ivelich, Yelizaveta was the co-heiress of her father's copper mines. According to her contemporaries, she was a generous and kind woman, but quick-tempered and strict to her children. Titov had 10 children with her:

 Nikolai (1791–1794)
 Felitsata (1792–?)
 Fyodor (1793–1810)
 Yekaterina (1794–?)
 Anna (1796–1858), married the officer Sergey Izmaylov in 1835.
 Alexander (1797–?)
 Pyotr (1798–1850)
 Nikolai (1800–1874), composer of waltzes, quadrilles, and marches.
 Mikhail (1804–1853), composer of romances.
 Varvara (1804–1806)

References

1769 births
1827 deaths
Russian male classical composers
Classical-period composers
Russian Romantic composers
Russian opera composers
Male opera composers
Russian ballet composers
Musicians from Saint Petersburg
18th-century classical composers
18th-century male musicians
19th-century classical composers
19th-century male musicians